Eupithecia palmata is a moth in the family Geometridae first described by Samuel E. Cassino and Louis W. Swett in 1922. It is found in the US state of California. The habitat consists of deserts.

The wingspan is about 17 mm. The forewings are pale yellowish brown with a broad, somewhat darker shaded median band.

References

Moths described in 1922
palmata
Moths of North America